Bill Eastick (13 March 1888 – 22 October 1914) was an Australian rules footballer who played with South Melbourne. Eastick became ill early in the 1914 season and his health deteriorated throughout the year before his death in October.

Sources
Holmesby, Russell & Main, Jim (2007). The Encyclopedia of AFL Footballers. 7th ed. Melbourne: Bas Publishing.

External links

1888 births
Australian rules footballers from Victoria (Australia)
Sydney Swans players
Ballarat Imperial Football Club players
1914 deaths